Denis Čomor (born 3 January 1990) is a Bosnian professional footballer who  plays as a right-back for NK Kolina.

Club career

Sarajevo
Čomor started off his career at hometown club Sarajevo where he played for the club's academy until July 2009, after which he signed a contract with the first team. He spent four years at Sarajevo, making 64 league appearances and scoring 1 goal in the process.

After the end of the 2012–13 season, Čomor left Sarajevo.

Slavija Sarajevo
On 4 July 2013, Čomor signed a one-year deal with Slavija Sarajevo. His contract expired after the end of the 2013–14 season, and so he left Slavija.

Olimpik
In the 2014–15 season, Čomor played for another Sarajevan club, Olimpik.

In that season he was a part of the Olimpik team that won the club's first ever significant historic trophy, the Bosnian Cup, after the club beat Široki Brijeg in the final. He left Olimpik in June 2015.

2015–2018 period
In between 2015 and 2018, Čomor played for three Bosnian Premier League clubs.

He returned to and played for Slavija from 2015 to 2016, after Slavija, at the time newly promoted Krupa from 2016 to 2017 and after Krupa, from 2017 until June 2018, Mladost Doboj Kakanj.

Tuzla City
On 30 June 2018, Čomor signed with 2017–18 First League of FBiH champions Tuzla City. He made his debut for Tuzla City on 22 July 2018, in the first matchday of the 2018–19 league season, a 1–0 away loss against Široki Brijeg.

Čomor decided to leave Tuzla City on 2 June 2019.

Borac Banja Luka
On 11 July 2019, Čomor signed a one-year contract with a possibility of a one more year extension with Borac Banja Luka. He made his official debut for Borac on 10 August 2019, in a 1–2 away league win against Radnik Bijeljina. He decided to leave the club nearly a year later, on 20 May 2020.

Return to Slavija
On 11 August 2020, Čomor returned to Slavija Sarajevo.

International career
Čomor was a part of the Bosnia and Herzegovina U21 national team and made 1 cap but did not score a goal.

Career statistics

Club

Honours
Olimpik 
Bosnian Cup: 2014–15

References

External links
Denis Čomor at TablesLeague

1990 births
Living people
Bosnia and Herzegovina footballers
Bosnia and Herzegovina expatriate footballers
Footballers from Sarajevo
Association football fullbacks
Bosnia and Herzegovina under-21 international footballers
FK Sarajevo players
FK Slavija Sarajevo players
FK Olimpik players
FK Krupa players
FK Mladost Doboj Kakanj players
FK Tuzla City players
FK Borac Banja Luka players
Premier League of Bosnia and Herzegovina players
First League of the Republika Srpska players
Bosnia and Herzegovina expatriate sportspeople in Germany
Expatriate footballers in Germany